Dorcas Denhartog (born February 2, 1965) is a retired American cross-country skier who competed in the late 1980s. She finished eighth in the 4 × 5 km relay at the 1988 Winter Olympics in Calgary.

Denhartog graduated from Middlebury College in 1987, where she won the individual title at the 1985 NCAA Women's Division III Cross Country Championship.

She currently works as a school teacher and amateur cross-country coach.

Cross-country skiing results
All results are sourced from the International Ski Federation (FIS).

Olympic Games

World Championships

World Cup

Season standings

References

External links

Women's 4 x 5 km cross-country relay Olympic results: 1976-2002 

1965 births
Living people
American female cross-country skiers
Cross-country skiers at the 1988 Winter Olympics
Cross-country skiers at the 1992 Winter Olympics
Cross-country skiers at the 1994 Winter Olympics
Middlebury College alumni
Olympic cross-country skiers of the United States
21st-century American women